The Prut (also spelled in English as Pruth;) is a  long river in Eastern Europe. It is a left tributary of the Danube. In part of its course it forms Romania's border with Moldova and Ukraine.

Characteristics
The Prut originates on the eastern slope of Mount Hoverla, in the Carpathian Mountains in Ukraine (Ivano-Frankivsk Oblast). At first, the river flows to the north. Near Yaremche it turns to the northeast, and near Kolomyia to the south-east. Having reached the border between Moldova and Romania, it turns even more to the south-east, and then to the south. It eventually joins the Danube near Giurgiulești, east of Galați and west of Reni.

Between 1918 and 1939, the river was partly in Poland and partly in Greater Romania (Romanian: România Mare). Prior to World War I, it served as a border between Romania and the Russian Empire. After World War II, the river once again denoted a border, this time between Romania and the Soviet Union. The largest city along its banks is Chernivtsi, Ukraine.

The Stânca-Costești Dam, operated jointly by Moldova and Romania, is built on the Prut. There is also a Hydro-Electric Station in Sniatyn (Ukraine). Ships travel from the river's mouth to the port city of Leova (southern Moldova).

The lowermost part of the basin is strongly marshy. The slope of the river varies from 100 m/km (near the source) to 0.05 m/km (near the mouth). In the upper reaches (to Delyatyn) it has a mountainous character, with a steep right bank, sometimes the cross-sectional profile of the channel has the form of a ridge. Near the city of Yaremche is the waterfall of Probiy.

About the name
The Prut was known in Antiquity as the Pyretus, or Scythian Porata (possibly), Hierasus or Gerasius. Herodotus lists the Prut, under the name of Porata or Pyretus, as being among the five rivers flowing through the Scythian country which swell the Danube. In the second volume of the Ottoman-Bulgarian chronicles of Iman "Jagfar Tarihi" (1680) the Prut River is referred to as Burat. And in the Byzantine treatise of Constantine Porphyrogennetos "On the management of the empire" it is mentioned as the Brut river (Chap. 38) or as Burat (Chapter 42).

Towns

The following towns are situated along the river Prut, from source to mouth: Vorokhta, Yaremche, Deliatyn, Lanchyn, Kolomyia, Zabolotiv, Sniatyn, Nepolokivtsi, Luzhany, Chernivtsi, Novoselytsia, Darabani, Lipcani, Ungheni, Leova, Cantemir and Cahul

Tributaries

The following rivers are tributaries to the river Prut (source to mouth):

Left: Turka, Chorniava, Sovytsia, Rokytna, Rynhach, Cherlena, Larga (Briceni), Vilia, Lopatnic, Racovăț, Ciuhur, Camenca, Delia, Nârnova, Lăpușna, Sărata, Larga (Cantemir)

Right: Pistynka, Rybnytsia, Cheremosh, Derelui, Hertsa, Poiana, Cornești, Isnovăț, Rădăuți, Ghireni, Volovăț, Badu, Bașeu, Corogea, Berza Veche, Râioasa, Soloneț, Cerchezoaia, Jijia, Bohotin, Moșna, Pruteț, Gârla Boul Bătrân, Copăceana, Belciug, Elan, Horincea, Oancea, Stoeneșa, Brănești, Chineja

Historical events

In 1538, the Ottoman army of Suleiman the Magnificent crossed Prut during the campaign of Karaboğdan.

During the Russo-Turkish War of 1710–1711, on 19 July 1711 Russian forces initially divided among Peter the Great's army on the west bank and Boris Sheremetev's army on the east bank of the Pruth and allied with Dimitrie Cantemir, the ruler of Moldova, met with the Ottoman army led by Grand Vizier Baltaci Mehmed Pasha. The Turks and Crimean Tatars attacked first against Sheremetev, who then retreated to the other side to join Peter the Great. Afterwards the Russian army set up a defensive camp between Stănilești and the river, which was then completely surrounded by the Ottoman army. Negotiations started on 21 July 1711 and the Treaty of the Prut was signed on 23 July 1711.
After this treaty, Dimitrie Cantemir had to go in exile at Moscow. This treaty means the end of local dynasties of kings and inauguration of Greek rulers from the Fanar Quarter of Istanbul (Phanariotes).

During the Russo-Turkish War of 1768-74, on 1 August 1700, Russian forces led by Field Marshal Pytor Rumyantsev defeated a larger Ottoman army led by Grand Vizier Ivazzade Halil Pasha in the Battle of Kagul on the Prut.

In 1821, the Greek Nationalist leader Alexander Ypsilantis crossed the Prut river at Sculeni, with the intention of touching off a rebellion in the Danubian Principalities. Though the Wallachian uprising ultimately failed - due especially to irreconcilable differences between Ypsilantis and his Wallachian ally Tudor Vladimirescu - it did touch off the Greek War of Independence, leading to the Kingdom of Greece gaining independence ten years later. In the Principalities it led to the end of the aforementioned Greek Phanariote rule, and indirectly to increasing self-government and eventually to the independence of Romania several decades later. In Greek history, Ypsilantis' crossing of the Prut is an important historical event, commemorated in a famous painting displayed at Athens.

Popular culture
Sydir Vorobkevych: Within that Prut Valley (Над Прутом у лузі).

Within that Prut Valley a cabin rests close
In which lives a lassie—a beautiful rose:
Her eyes like the bright stars that lighten the sky;
When you see them, laddie, you'll pause with a sigh.

Within that Prut Valley the moon does not shine,
'Tis only a lover has come to his shrine.
A sweet conversation in murmur now goes
While dreamy old river just quietly flows.

Within that Prut Valley the flowers are plucked
And wreathes for the wedding with myrtle are tucked;
Inside of the cabin play fiddles and bass
While friends sing together: To their Happiness!
Translated by Waldimir Semenyna (13 October 1933, Ukrainian Weekly).

Bridges
Lipcani-Rădăuți Bridge
Eiffel Bridge, Ungheni
Costești-Stânca
 Fălciu-Cantemir
 Oancea-Cahul
 Galați-Giurgiulești

See also
Moldavia
Pokuttya

Gallery

References

External links

  Prut River at the Encyclopedia of Ukraine

 
 
International rivers of Europe
Moldova–Romania border
Ramsar sites in Ukraine
Rivers of Botoșani County
Rivers of Chernivtsi Oblast
Rivers of Galați County
Rivers of Iași County
Rivers of Ivano-Frankivsk Oblast
Rivers of Moldova
Rivers of Romania
Rivers of Vaslui County
Romania–Russian Empire border